People's Recreation Community, originally known as People's Bookstore, was a bookstore in Hong Kong's Causeway Bay district. It was known as one of the last bookshops in Hong Kong selling titles banned by the Chinese Communist Party, and its closure in 2018 marked a change in the city’s historic independent publishing scene.

See also  
Causeway Bay Books 
Causeway Bay Books disappearances

References  

Bookshops of Hong Kong
Bookstores established in the 20th century